Man Luen Choon is a Chinese art supply store in Hong Kong.

History

Man Luen Choon was founded in 1955 by the Lee family. They have maintained a store in the Central district of Hong Kong since then. They sell art supplies as well as offering mounting, framing, backing, and other services. Their products are imported from mainland China, Taiwan, Korea, and Japan. The current owner is Monty Lee Mon-tat, the son of the founders.

Art gallery
Man Luen Choon's art gallery displays various Chinese artwork by painters including include Zhang Daqian, Xu Beihong, Zhao Shaoang (趙少昂), and others.

References

External links
Scans of newspaper articles hosted on MLC's website:
An article from the Apple Daily
Articles from Next Magazine
An article from the Hong Kong Daily News (新報)
An article from the Sing Pao Daily News
An article from Ming Pao
An article from Cosmos Books (天地圖書)
An article from Smart Shoppers Weekly (買得好週刊)
An article from HK Magazine
An article from Guardian UK
An article from (LOHAS 樂活)

Arts in Hong Kong
Retail companies of Hong Kong
Retail companies established in 1955
1955 establishments in Hong Kong
Arts and crafts retailers